Trygve B. Pedersen (26 July 1884 – 14 August 1967) was a Norwegian sailor who competed in the 1920 Summer Olympics. He was a crew member of the Norwegian boat Stella, which won the bronze medal in the 6 metre class (1907 rating).

References

External links
profile

1884 births
1967 deaths
Norwegian male sailors (sport)
Sailors at the 1920 Summer Olympics – 6 Metre
Olympic sailors of Norway
Olympic bronze medalists for Norway
Olympic medalists in sailing
Medalists at the 1920 Summer Olympics